Yang Hung-duen (born 3 September 1965) is a Taiwanese physicist. Yang was the president of National Sun Yat-sen University from 2008 to 2016, when he was selected to lead the Ministry of Science and Technology.

Academic career
Yang earned a bachelor's of science degree in physics from National Taiwan Normal University, and a doctorate in the subject from Iowa State University. Upon graduation in 1987, he returned to Taiwan for a teaching position at National Sun Yat-sen University. He was a visiting professor at Wayne State University from 1999 to 2000.

Political career
Yang led the Division of Natural Sciences and Mathematics at the National Science Council from 2001 to 2004, when he left for the Academia Sinica. He rejoined the NSC in 2006 as a deputy minister. In 2008, Yang was named President of National Sun Yat-sen University. In April 2016, he was appointed Minister of Science and Technology.

Works
 (Dissertation)

References

Living people
Ministers of Science and Technology of the Republic of China
1965 births
21st-century Taiwanese physicists
Politicians of the Republic of China on Taiwan from Kaohsiung
Academic staff of the National Sun Yat-sen University
National Taiwan Normal University alumni
Iowa State University alumni
Presidents of universities and colleges in Taiwan